"Story of the Warrior and the Captive" (original Spanish "Historia del Guerrero y la cautiva") is a short story by Argentinian writer Jorge Luis Borges. It first appeared in 1949 in the short story collection El Aleph and later appeared in Labyrinths.

Plot summary
The story compares two figures who eschewed their culture in favor of a foreign culture. The narrator first tells the story of Droctulft, a barbarian who, according to the historical writings of Paul the Deacon, abandoned the barbarian Lombards to join the Byzantine Army and defend the city of Ravenna.

The narrator then identifies himself as Borges (one of Borges's many forays into metafiction), and recounts a story that his grandmother had told him. He tells how his grandmother, an Englishwoman living in Buenos Aires in 1872, was introduced to another Englishwoman who, fifteen years earlier, had been taken captive by an indigenous tribe and wed to the chieftain. Borges's grandmother offers to protect her and retrieve her children, but the woman responds that she is happy with the natives and wishes to remain with them. Like Droctulft, she chose to leave the culture she was born into in favor of one completely alien to her.

See also
 Bibliography of Jorge Luis Borges

External links
 Story of the Warrior and the Captive in Google Books
 Borges and His Fiction: A Guide to His Mind and Art

1949 short stories
Short stories by Jorge Luis Borges